Gbolahan Olusegun Yishawu is a Nigerian politician who is a member of the Lagos State House of Assembly who has represented the constituency of Eti-Osa II since 2011.

References

Members of the Lagos State House of Assembly
1967 births
University of Lagos alumni
University of Nigeria alumni
Living people